Teatro Alcázar is a theatre located in Madrid, Spain. Designed by Eduardo Sánchez Eznarriaga, it is located on the Calle de Alcala. It was founded in 1925, with the first performance occurring on 27 January with the operetta Madame Pompadour by Leo Fall.

References
 Castro Jiménez, Antonio, Teatros históricos, edificios singulares. Centro Cultural de la Villa, 2006. 
 Castro Jiménez, Antonio, El teatro Alcázar (Palacio de los recreos). Prólogo: Enrique Salaberría. Diseño y desplegables: Asís G. Ayerbe. Grupo Smedia, 2010.

External links

Theatres in Madrid
Calle de Alcalá
Buildings and structures in Cortes neighborhood, Madrid